Kim Seung-hyun is a Korean name consisting of the family name Kim and the given name Seung-hyun, and may also refer to:

  (born 1960), South Korean television host
 Kim Seung-hyun (basketball) (born 1978), South Korean basketball player
 Kim Seung-hyun (footballer) (born 1979), South Korean footballer
  (born 1981), South Korean actor